Martin John Bibla (born October 4, 1979) is a former American football guard. He was drafted by the Atlanta Falcons in the fourth round of the 2002 NFL Draft. He played college football at the University of Miami.

Bibla has also been a member of the Denver Broncos, Philadelphia Soul, BC Lions, Las Vegas Locomotives, Omaha Nighthawks, and Sacramento Mountain Lions.

Early years
Bibla started his football career on the line at Crestwood High School in Pennsylvania, graduating in 1997.

Professional career

Atlanta Falcons
Bibla was drafted by the Atlanta Falcons in the fourth round of the 2002 NFL Draft, and played for the Falcons until being released in August 2005.

Denver Broncos
Bibla was signed by the Denver Broncos in January 2006 but was released.

Philadelphia Soul
He played two seasons for the Philadelphia Soul before the Arena Football League cancelled the 2009 season.

BC Lions
Bibla was signed by the BC Lions of the Canadian Football League on April 28, 2009. He left the team after one practice and was cut on June 25, 2009.

Las Vegas Locomotives
Bibla was signed by the Las Vegas Locomotives of the United Football League on August 31, 2009.

References

External links
Arena Football League bio
Miami Hurricanes bio
Just Sports Stats

1979 births
Living people
People from Belleville, New Jersey
People from Luzerne County, Pennsylvania
Players of American football from New Jersey
Players of American football from Pennsylvania
American football offensive guards
American football defensive linemen
American players of Canadian football
Canadian football offensive linemen
Miami Hurricanes football players
Atlanta Falcons players
Denver Broncos players
Philadelphia Soul players
BC Lions players
Las Vegas Locomotives players
Omaha Nighthawks players
Sacramento Mountain Lions players